James McGregor may refer to:
 James McGregor (footballer) (fl. 1901–1910), Scottish footballer (Grimsby Town)
 James L. McGregor (born 1953), American author, journalist, and China analyst
 James Drummond McGregor (1838–1918), Canadian businessman, politician, and lieutenant governor of Nova Scotia
 James Duncan McGregor (1860–1935), Canadian politician
 James Lewin McGregor (1921–1988), mathematician
 James Russell McGregor (died 1973), leader of the Black Muslims
 James McGregor (minister), Scotch-Irish Presbyterian minister
 Jim McGregor (born 1948), former Republican member of the Ohio House of Representatives

See also
 James MacGregor (disambiguation)
 James McGrigor (disambiguation)